Henry Cuyler Bunner (August 3, 1855 – May 11, 1896) was an American novelist, journalist and poet. He is known mainly for Tower of Babel.

Bunner's works have been praised by librarians for its "technical dexterity, playfulness and smoothness of finish".

Biography
Henry Cuyler Bunner was born at August 3,1855 in Oswego, New York to Rudolph Bunner Jr. (1813–1875) and Ruth Keating Tuckerman (1821–1896) and was educated in New York City. His paternal grandparents were Rudolph Bunner (1779–1837) and Elizabeth Church (1783–1867), the daughter of John Barker Church (1748–1818) and Angelica Schuyler (1756–1814). Among his works "Airs from Arcady and Elsewhere," published in 1884 and including one of his best known poems, "The Way to Arcady"; "Rowen" (1892), and "Poems" (1896), edited by his friend Brander Matthews and displaying a light play of imagination and a delicate workmanship. He also wrote clever vers de société and parodies. One of his several plays (usually written in collaboration) was The Tower of Babel (1883).

His short story Zenobia's Infidelity was made into a feature film called Zenobia starring Harry Langdon and Oliver Hardy by the Hal Roach Studio in 1939.

Personal life
Bunner married Alice Learned (1863–1952), daughter of Joshua Coit Learned (1819–1892), and granddaughter of Joshua Coit (1758–1798), U.S. Representative from Connecticut. Together, they had:

 Rudolph Bunner (1887–1888), who died young
 Ruth Tuckerman Bunner (1890–1946), who married Harold Edwin Dimock (1884–1967) in 1917, brother of Edith Dimock (1876–1955), the artist.
 Philip Schuyler Bunner (1892–1892), who died young
 Laurence H. Bunner (1894–1974)

Bunner died on May 11, 1896, in Nutley, New Jersey.

References

External links

 
 
 
 Some H. C. Bunner stories, including 'What Mrs. Fortescue Did' and 'Zenobia's Infidelity' are read in Mister Ron's Basement Podcast, now indexed for your convenience.
 The Best American Humorous Short Stories by H. C. Bunner et al. Project Gutenberg eBook

1855 births
1896 deaths
Schuyler family
People from Nutley, New Jersey
People from Oswego, New York
19th-century American novelists
19th-century American poets
American male novelists
American male poets
19th-century male writers
Novelists from New York (state)